Bertie Childs (20 October 1894 – 10 October 1960) was a British fencer. He competed at the 1928 and 1936 Summer Olympics. In 1928 and 1931, he won the épée title at the British Fencing Championships.

References

1894 births
1960 deaths
British male fencers
Olympic fencers of Great Britain
Fencers at the 1928 Summer Olympics
Fencers at the 1936 Summer Olympics